Paul et Virginie (sometimes known in English as Paul and Virginia) is a novel by Jacques-Henri Bernardin de Saint-Pierre, first published in 1788. The novel's title characters are friends since birth who fall in love. The story is set on the island of Mauritius under French rule, then named Île de France. Written on the eve of the French Revolution, the novel is recognized as Bernardin's finest work. It records the fate of a child of nature corrupted by the artificial sentimentality of the French upper classes in the late eighteenth century. Bernardin de Saint-Pierre lived on the island for a time and based part of the novel on a shipwreck he witnessed there.

Book critics
Bernardin de Saint-Pierre's novel criticizes the social class divisions found in eighteenth-century French society.  He describes the perfect equality of social relations on Mauritius, whose inhabitants share their possessions, have equal amounts of land, and all work to cultivate it.  They live in harmony, without violence or unrest.  The author's beliefs echo those of Enlightenment philosophers such as Jean-Jacques Rousseau.  He argues for the emancipation of slaves.  He was a friend of Mahé de La Bourdonnais, the governor of Mauritius, who appears in the novel providing training and encouragement for the island's natives.  Although Paul and Virginie own slaves, they appreciate their labour and do not treat them badly.  When other slaves in the novel are mistreated, the book's heroes confront the cruel masters.

The novel presents an Enlightenment view of religion: that God, or "Providence", has designed a world that is harmonious and pleasing.  The characters of Paul et Virginie live off the land without needing technology or man-made interference.  For instance, they tell time by observing the shadows of the trees.  One critic noted that Bernadin de Saint-Pierre "admired the forethought which ensured that dark-coloured fleas should be conspicuous on white skin", believing "that the earth was designed for man’s terrestrial happiness and convenience".

Thomas Carlyle in The French Revolution: A History, wrote: "[It is a novel in which] there rises melodiously, as it were, the wail of a moribund world: everywhere wholesome Nature in unequal conflict with diseased, perfidious art; cannot escape from it in the lowest hut, in the remotest island of the sea." Alexander von Humboldt, too, cherished Paul et Virginie since his youth and recalled the novel on his American journey.

The novel's fame was such that when the participants at the Versailles Peace Conference in 1920 considered the status of Mauritius, the New York Times headlined its coverage:

Literary references and adaptations
The novel served as the basis for a hugely successful opera of the same name, composed by Jean-François Le Sueur, which premiered at the Théâtre Feydeau in Paris on 13 January 1794.
In Le Curé de village (The country parson; 1839), Honoré de Balzac described how "the revelation of love came through a charming book from the hand of a genius" and then more clearly identified the work: "sweet fancies of love derived from Bernardin de Saint-Pierre's book".
Gustave Flaubert in Madame Bovary (1856) described how Emma's experience of literature formed her imagination: "She had read Paul et Virginie, and she had fantasized about the little bamboo cottage, the Negro Domingo, the dog Fidèle, but even more the sweet friendship of some good little brother who would go and gather ripe fruits for you from great trees taller than spires, or who would run barefoot in the sand, bringing you a bird's nest." In Un Cœur simple (A Simple Heart; 1877), he used the names Paul and Virginie for the two children of Madame Aubain, Félicité's employer.
In Little Dorrit by Charles Dickens, Flora Finching, the former fiancée of protagonist Arthur Clennam, reminds him how after their parents had forced them apart, he had returned a copy of Paul and Virginia to her "without note or comment." The rough parallel between their failed engagement and the tragic history of Paul and Virginia isn't explicated, but would have been obvious to Finching and Clennam.
The novel inspired, and served as title for, a duet for clarinet and violin with piano accompaniment by Amilcare Ponchielli, which was published in 1857.
Victor Massé wrote a very successful opera on the subject, again titled Paul and Virginie, in 1876.
The English author William Hurrell Mallock titled his 1878 satirical novel The New Paul and Virginia, or Positivism on an Island (1878) after Bernadin de Saint-Pierre's work.
Guy de Maupassant in Bel Ami (1885) described a desolate room with minimal furnishings that include "two coloured pictures representing Paul and Virginie".
The novel The Blue Lagoon (1908) was inspired by Paul et Virginie.
It served as the basis for an American short silent film Paul and Virginia in 1910.
In Women in Love (1920) by D. H. Lawrence, Birkin makes reference to Paul et Virginie when taking Ursula on a punt (chapter 11).
The architect Le Corbusier mentioned Paul et Virginie as one of the "great works of art...based on one or other of the great standards of the heart" in Toward an Architecture (1923).
The Cuban author Alejo Carpentier's El reino de este mundo (1949; English The Kingdom of This World) recurs widely on the poetic world of the classical novel.
Jorge Luis Borges mentions the novel in his story The South, the final chapter of Ficciones: "Something in its poor architecture recalled a steel engraving, perhaps one from an old edition of Paul et Virginie."
Cordwainer Smith Bases the arc of the two main characters in his story Alpha Ralpha Boulevard on Paul et Virginie, naming his characters Paul and Virginia and setting the story in a partial revival of 19th and 20th century French culture some 14000 years in our future.
In Indiana (1832), George Sand mentions the titular characters in chapter 30 when Ralph professes his love for Indiana.
Lewis Gilbert's 1971 film Friends was largely inspired by Paul et Virginie.

Popular music
 Circa 1855 Louis-Antoine Jullien published the Paul et Virginie Valse.
 The Cincinnati band Over the Rhine has a song titled "Paul and Virginia" on their album 'Till We Have Faces' (itself a reference to the novel by C. S. Lewis)

References 

 
 Norman Hampson, The Enlightenment (Penguin,1982)

External links

 , translated by Helen Maria Williams
  Paul et Virginie, audio version 
 

1788 novels
18th-century French novels
French novels adapted into films
French romance novels
Novels set in Mauritius
Isle de France (Mauritius)
Novels set in the French colonial empire
Novels adapted into operas